Vicino may refer to:

Bruno Vicino (born 1952), Italian cyclist
Giuseppe Vicino (born 1993), Italian rower
Vicino da Ferrara (1432–1509), Italian painter
Poggio San Vicino, Italian comune
Monte San Vicino, a mountain in Italy

Italian-language surnames